
Morgetshofsee is a kettle lake at Thayngen in the canton of Schaffhausen, Switzerland. The lake and its surroundings are listed in the Federal Inventory of Amphibian Spawning Areas as a site of national importance.

The following species were observed at Morgetshofsee: Common Frog (Rana temporaria), Edible Frog, Agile Frog (Rana dalmatina), European tree frog (Hyla arborea), Alpine Newt (Triturus alpestris), Great Crested Newt (Triturus cristatus), Smooth Newt (Triturus vulgaris) and Common Toad (Bufo bufo).

References

Lakes of the canton of Schaffhausen
Lakes of Switzerland
IUCN Category IV
Protected areas of Switzerland